Meliaceae, the mahogany family, is a flowering plant family of mostly trees and shrubs (and a few herbaceous plants, mangroves) in the order Sapindales.

They are characterised by alternate, usually pinnate leaves without stipules, and by syncarpous, apparently bisexual (but actually mostly cryptically unisexual) flowers borne in panicles, cymes, spikes, or clusters. Most species are evergreen, but some are deciduous, either in the dry season or in winter.

The family includes about 53 genera and about 600 known species, with a pantropical distribution; one genus (Toona) extends north into temperate China and south into southeast Australia, another (Synoum) into southeast Australia, and another (Melia) nearly as far north. They most commonly grow as understory trees in rainforests, but are also found in mangroves and arid regions.

The fossil record of the family extends back into the Late Cretaceous.

Uses
Various species are used for vegetable oil, soap-making, insecticides, and highly prized wood (mahogany).

Some economically important genera and species belong to this family:
Neem tree Azadirachta indica (India)
Carapa: includes the "crabwood trees" e.g. Carapa procera (South America and Africa)
Cedrela odorata Central and South America; timber also known as Spanish-cedar
Entandrophragma: includes sapele and "utile" or "sipo" (E. utile) of tropical Africa
Guarea, the genus of Bossé or "pink mahogany" includes: G. thompsonii and  G. cedrata (Africa)
Khaya includes: Ivory Coast Mahogany and Senegal Mahogany (tropical Africa)
Chinaberry or white cedar, Melia azedarach (Indomalaya and Australasia)
 Santol (Sandoricum koetjape), grown for their edible fruit in Southeast Asia and South Asia
 Lanzones (Lansium parasiticum), grown for their edible fruit in Southeast Asia
Swietenia is the classic "mahogany" genus from the tropical Americas
Toona: the genus of "toon tree" species (tropical Asia, Malesia, and Australia), especially Toona ciliata

Genera

Subfamily Cedreloideae 
This is also known as subfamily Swietenioideae.

Subfamily Melioideae

Notes

References
  (1975): A generic monograph of the Meliaceae. Blumea 22: 419–540.

External links
Meliaceae in L. Watson and M.J. Dallwitz (1992 onwards). The families of flowering plants.
Project Meliaceae

 
Sapindales families